Surampalli is a North suburb of Vijayawada City  Krishna district of the Indian state of Andhra Pradesh. It is located in Gannavaram mandal under the Nuzvid revenue division. Surampalli village has most of the manufacturing industries like garments, mechanical etc.,. Next to the Auto Nagar area in Vijayawada city, we could see most of the manufacturing industries situated in Surampalli which is in the outskirts of Vijayawada city and is around 15KM distance from Vijayawada city. Mainly we could see most of the Iron and other metal making and moulding industries near to this village like Kusalava International, G.S. Polymers etc.,

See also 
List of villages in Krishna district

References

Villages in Krishna district
Neighbourhoods in Vijayawada